Amir Hossein Peiravani ( born in Shiraz, Iran) is an Iranian retired footballer and manager. He is currently the assistant coach of Tractor Sazi.

External links 
 Amir Hossein Peiravani on instagram

References

Living people
Iranian footballers
Iranian football managers
People from Shiraz
Bargh Shiraz players
1969 births
Iran national under-20 football team managers
Olympic football managers of Iran
Association football forwards
Sportspeople from Fars province
Gahar Zagros F.C. managers